Douglas Terrell Buckley (born June 7, 1971) is a former American football cornerback and current head coach of the Orlando Guardians. He also played professional baseball for the Mobile Baysharks in the Texas-Louisiana League.

College career
Buckley was a two-year starter and three-year letterman at Florida State (1989–91), and left as the school's all-time leader in interceptions (21) and interception return yards (501).  His career interception yardage total of 501 is an NCAA record. He also tied school records for touchdowns off interception returns (four) and punt returns (three). He was named first-team All-American and won Jim Thorpe Award, given annually to nation's top cornerback, as a junior. He led the nation with 12 interceptions for 238 yards and two touchdowns. He was named second-team All-American by Associated Press, The Sporting News and The Football News as a junior. Had six interceptions with two returned for touchdowns. He finished 7th in the Heisman voting in 1991. He played two years of varsity baseball and was a sprinter on the outdoor track team for one year.  He was drafted by the Green Bay Packers in the NFL draft.

Professional career

Buckley is one of only two players (The other being Ken Riley) with 50+ interceptions to never make a Pro Bowl. In a game against Cincinnati in 1992, his rookie season, Buckley set what remains a current record as the youngest player to return a punt for a touchdown in NFL history. That was his only punt return for a touchdown of his career. He responded to criticism of the veracity of his tackling by giving himself the nickname “The Vaccinator”. The nickname would stay with him over the years if only in an ironic sense. On April 3, 1995, the Packers traded Buckley to the Miami Dolphins for "past considerations." In 1996, he led the league in interception return yards with 164.

He had at least one interception in 13 consecutive seasons. While playing for the New England Patriots, in the 2001 AFC Championship Game against the Pittsburgh Steelers, Buckley had an interception in the 24–17 win. He won a Super Bowl ring one week later in the win over the St. Louis Rams.

Coaching

Florida State

Buckley got his coaching start after earning his undergraduate degree from Florida State in 2007. From 2008–2011, he served in various assistant roles on Bobby Bowden and Jimbo Fisher’s staffs.

Akron
Finally getting his first on-the-field coaching position, Buckley was hired by his collegiate head coach's son, Terry Bowden, at the University of Akron in January 2012 to coach cornerbacks. This reunited him with Coach Chuck Amato and with Coach Todd Stroud—who he played for, and coached with at FSU.

Louisville
After two seasons at Akron, he was hired as the cornerbacks coach at the University of Louisville in January 2014.

Mississippi State
On January 7, 2016 Buckley was hired as the safeties coach at Mississippi State University

Ole Miss
On January 18, 2020, Buckley was hired as cornerbacks coach Ole Miss by Lane Kiffin, the new Head Coach, MSU's rival (Buckley, having had phenomenal success in both recruiting and developing elite talent both on and off the field, and for grooming NFL talent).

XFL 
On April 6, 2022, it was reported that Buckley had accepted a job with the XFL to become the Head Coach of an upcoming Orlando franchise (the former Tampa Bay Vipers).  The league confirmed Buckley's hiring, but not the existence of a team in Orlando, on April 14. On July 25, 2022, the XFL confirmed a franchise in Orlando, Florida with Buckley announced as head coach. On October 31st 2022 the team was branded the Orlando Guardians

Head Coaching Record

XFL

Personal
Buckley has three daughters, Sherrell, Brianna, and Britney. He majored in Theater with a minor in Political Science, and played baseball in the Atlanta Braves organization prior to reporting to GB training camp in July 1994. He is the son of Eddie Buckley Sr. of Columbia, MS and Laura Buckley of Pascagoula, MS.  He was a distant cousin of former Chicago Bears running back Walter Payton. His hobbies include baseball, basketball and golf. Has participated in events benefiting the Make-A-Wish Foundation and the Cystic Fibrosis Foundation. He has worked on behalf of the national "Feed the Children" campaign. He assisted in building a house in Little Haiti for Habitat for Humanity during the 1999 offseason. Sports Talk radio host Jim Rome refers to Buckley as "T-Buck" and credits him as one of The Jungle's first guests who appeared consistently on the program. Rome credits Buckley as the inventor of the Lambeau Leap, based on an interview that Buckley gave.

References

External links
 

1971 births
Living people
Akron Zips football coaches
All-American college football players
Baseball players from Mississippi
American football cornerbacks
Denver Broncos players
Florida State Seminoles baseball players
Florida State Seminoles football players
Green Bay Packers players
Louisville Cardinals football coaches
Miami Dolphins players
New England Patriots players
New York Giants players
New York Jets players
Ole Miss Rebels football coaches
People from Pascagoula, Mississippi
Macon Braves players
Mobile BayBears players